Khamagib is a rural locality (a selo) in Tlogobsky Selsoviet, Gunibsky District, Republic of Dagestan, Russia. The population was 72 as of 2010.

Geography 
Khamagib is located 45 km northwest of Gunib (the district's administrative centre) by road, on the Kudiyabor River. Enseruda and Amuarib are the nearest rural localities.

Nationalities 
Avars live there.

References 

Rural localities in Gunibsky District